Tomás Carbonell was the defending champion but lost in the quarterfinals to Gilbert Schaller.

Hicham Arazi won in the final 3–6, 6–1, 6–2 against Franco Squillari.

Seeds

  Karim Alami (semifinals)
  Hicham Arazi (champion)
  Roberto Carretero (first round)
  Gilbert Schaller (semifinals)
  Richard Fromberg (second round)
  Tomás Carbonell (quarterfinals)
  Oliver Gross (second round)
  Emilio Benfele Álvarez (quarterfinals)

Draw

Finals

Top half

Bottom half

External links
 1997 Grand Prix Hassan II draw

1997 ATP Tour
1997 Grand Prix Hassan II